The Criminal Jurisdiction Act 1802 (42 Geo 3 c 85) was an Act of the Parliament of the United Kingdom.

In the wake of the attempted impeachment of Warren Hastings, it legislated for the Court of King's Bench to try and punish past, present and future offences by colonial officials and military officers as if they had been committed in Middlesex, Westminster or any county where the offender resided (Sections 1 and 6). It also enabled that court to obtain evidence from governors, local courts and others in the area where the offence occurred by writ of mandamus (Section 2) and made other provisions for the gathering of that evidence (Sections 3–4) as well as applying the usual perjury laws (Section 5).

The Act thus applied more widely the provisions of the Governors of Plantations Act 1698 and the East India Company Acts of 1772 and 1784 and was later extended to offences under the Official Secrets Act 1889. Part of Sections 2 to 6 of the Act were repealed as to the UK by Section 2 of Public Works Loans Act 1892, words from Section 1 by the Criminal Justice Act 1948 and Sections 2 to 6 in their entirety by the Statute Law Revision Act 1964 – there are no remaining outstanding effects from the Act.

References

United Kingdom Acts of Parliament 1802
Legislation in British India
British East India Company
1802 in India
Governance of the British Empire
High Court of Justice